The Red Prince (German: Der rote Prinz) is a 1954 Austrian-West German historical drama film directed by Hans Schott-Schöbinger and Franz Antel and starring Inge Egger, Peter Pasetti and Richard Häussler. It is based on the story of Archduke Johann Salvator of Austria.

It was shot at the Thalerhof Studios in Graz and on location in a variety of sites including the Schönbrunn Palace, Bad Aussee and Gmunden. The film's sets were designed by the art director Eduard Stolba.

Synopsis
Archduke Johann Salvator, a member of the Habsburg Family and an officer serving in the Austrian Army causes a scandal by falling in love with and marrying the dancer Milly Stubel. Condemned as insane by his family and confined in the 
Schloss Ort in rural Austria, he manages to escape with his wife to Genoa where he renounces all his titles and calls himself Johann Orth. They plan to sail away to start a new life away from the conventions of Vienna, but a courtier seek vengeance on them by plotting to sink their ship.

Cast
 Inge Egger as Milly Stubel
 Peter Pasetti as Johann Orth
 Richard Häussler as Dr. Orbis
 Rolf Wanka as Rittmeister Graf Daun
 Kurt Heintel as Baron Frederik Angelo
 Margrit Aust as Gladys
 Willy Danek as 	Major Petöfi
 Fritz von Friedl as Clemens Stubel
 Peter Preses as Dr. Haschek
 Alois Stadlmayr as Adam, Schloßverwalter
 Hugo Gottschlich as Andreas Kranzel
 Herbert Herbe as Dr. Davis

References

Bibliography 
 Fritsche, Maria. Homemade Men in Postwar Austrian Cinema: Nationhood, Genre and Masculinity. Berghahn Books, 2013.

External links 
 

1954 films
1954 drama films
Austrian historical drama films
1950s historical drama films
1950s German-language films
Films directed by Hans Schott-Schöbinger
Films directed by Franz Antel
Austrian black-and-white films
Films set in Genoa
Films set in Vienna
Films shot in Vienna
Films set in the 1880s
Films set in the 1890s
West German films
German historical drama films